Xiangyang Subdistrict is a subdistrict in Aimin District, Mudanjiang, Heilongjiang, China. , it has 3 residential communities under its administration.

See also 
 List of township-level divisions of Heilongjiang

References 

Township-level divisions of Heilongjiang
Mudanjiang